The 2001 election of members to the Senate of the Philippines was the 27th election to the Senate of the Philippines. It was held on Monday, May 14, 2001, to elect 12 of the 24 seats in the Senate. Independent candidate Noli de Castro, a journalist and former television anchor, was announced as the topnotcher. This became the first synchronized national and local elections held after the ouster of former President Joseph Estrada in January due to a military-backed civilian uprising, popularly known as EDSA II.

The two competing coalitions in this election were the anti-Estrada People Power Coalition and the pro-Estrada Puwersa ng Masa coalition. The PPC was composed of Lakas—National Union of Christian Democrats—United Muslim Democrats of the Philippines, Partido para sa Demokratikong Reporma—Lapiang Manggagawa, Aksyon Demokratiko, Probinsya Muna Development Initiative, Liberal Party and Partido Demokratiko Pilipino—Lakas ng Bayan, while the Puwersa ng Masa included Laban ng Demokratikong Pilipino and Partido ng Masang Pilipino along with pro-Estrada independent candidates. Twelve seats were supposed to be contested but with the appointment of Teofisto Guingona Jr. as Vice President, the Commission on Elections ruled that the thirteenth-placer candidate would serve the remainder of Guingona's term.

The PPC won eight seats, the Puwersa ng Masa won four, and Noli de Castro as an independent won one; PPC's Ralph Recto edged out Puwersa ng Masa's Gregorio Honasan for the twelfth place and Honasan was elected to serve the remainder of Guingona's term. On February 20, 2007, the Supreme Court of the Philippines ruled that Honasan did lose the election but declared the special election constitutional for the remaining three-year term of Teofisto Guingona Jr.

Candidates

Administration coalition

Opposition coalition

Others

Note: Party affiliation based on Certificate of Candidacy.

Retiring and term limited incumbents

 Nikki Coseteng (NPC), term limited; ran for senator in 2007 and lost
 Francisco Tatad (PRP), term limited; ran for senator in 2004 and in 2010 and lost both times

Mid-term vacancies
 Gloria Macapagal Arroyo (Lakas), ran for Vice President of the Philippines and won in 1998
Arroyo subsequently became president on January 20, 2001, after the Second EDSA Revolution which resulted in the overthrow of Joseph Estrada.
Marcelo Fernan (LDP), died on July 11, 1999
Teofisto Guingona Jr. (Lakas), appointed Vice President of the Philippines on February 7, 2001
Raul Roco (Aksyon), appointed Secretary of Education, Culture and Sports on February 10, 2001

Results 
The People Power Coalition (PPC) won eight seats, the Puwersa ng Masa won four, and an independent candidate won one. Of the four seats Puwersa ng Masa won, one was for the seat of Vice President Teofisto Guingona Jr., whose senatorial term would have ended on June 30, 2004.

Four incumbent senators won: Franklin Drilon, Juan Flavier, Ramon Magsaysay Jr. and Serge Osmeña of PPC,

There are seven neophyte senators: PPC's Joker Arroyo, Francis Pangilinan, Ralph Recto, Manny Villar, Puwersa ng Masa's Loi Ejercito and Panfilo Lacson, independent candidate Noli de Castro.

Returning is Edgardo Angara, who was term limited in the previous election.

Puwersa ng Masa senators Gregorio Honasan  Miriam Defensor Santiago and Juan Ponce Enrile did not successfully defend their seats.

Key:
 ‡ Seats up
 + Gained by a party from another party
 √ Held by the incumbent
 * Held by the same party with a new senator
^ Vacancy

Per candidate

Per coalition

Per party

See also
Commission on Elections
Politics of the Philippines
Philippine elections
Philippine midterm election
12th Congress of the Philippines

References
SWS Media Release. Accessed on March 2007

External links
 Official website of the Commission on Elections
 Official website of the House of Representatives 

2001
2001 Philippine general election
Special elections to the Congress of the Philippines
May 2001 events in the Philippines